Jean de Limur (13 November 1887, Vouhé, Charente-Maritime – 5 June 1976, Paris) was a French film director, actor and screenwriter. His works include La Garçonne (1936) and The Letter (1929). A French army officer and a designer, he first came to the United States with his parents, Count and Countess de Limur in September 1920; their destination was Burlingame, California, where lived Jean's brother André (who married Ethel, daughter of William Henry Crocker).

Filmography
 The Arab (1924) actor
 Human Desires (1924)
 The Legion of the Condemned (1928) co-screenplay
 The Letter (1929) director
 Jealousy (1929) director
 My Childish Father (1930)
 Paprika (1933) director
 L'Auberge du Petit-Dragon (1935)
 La Garçonne (1936) director; with Arletty, Edith Piaf, and Marie Bell

References

External links

1887 births
1976 deaths
French film directors
French male film actors
French male silent film actors
People from Charente-Maritime
20th-century French male actors
French expatriate male actors in the United States